Randy Johnston (September 25, 1988October 11, 2008) was an American model. He was represented by the Ford NY modeling agency and was best known for his starring in the fall 2007 Dior Homme advertising campaign.

Johnston was born in Waterford, Connecticut, United States, of German and English descent. He was a successful model; besides his best known role as the last "Dior Boy", he did an ad campaign for Levi's in 2008 with Rachel Clark and Shannan Click. His last known modeling gig was an appearance in the November 2008 issue of the i-D magazine with Lara Stone. Randy was also a talented musician, and multi-instrumentalist;(drums, bass, guitar) playing in a few Connecticut based indie rock and punk bands. One talented up and coming band, with best friend Jared, called The Electric Noise Act (drumming), and another local band called Soviet Tribe. also providing exciting rhythmic dimension on drums. His favorite book was Things Fall Apart, by Chinua Achebe.

At the time of his death, his hobbies included skateboarding, reading, as well as writing poetry, prose, and sketching. He also had a passion for developing photography of his own; stating that he'd like to be behind the camera professionally, one day. He used TMax400 black and white film. He began to photograph his friends, and his hometown city's architecture. He delighted in sailing boats with his grandfather, camping, and survivalist strategy, He became quite skilled in many areas and crafts.

After a dedicated and sincere attempt at getting off drugs, Johnston relapsed, after three months of sobriety, and died in New London, Connecticut, suddenly on October 11, 2008 around 5pm Eastern Standard Time. He was 20 years old. The cause of death was a drug overdose, which was ruled accidental.

See also 
 List of deaths from drug overdose and intoxication

References

External links 
 

People from Waterford, Connecticut
American people of German descent
American people of English descent
Drug-related deaths in Connecticut
1988 births
2008 deaths
Male models from Connecticut